The following are the Pulitzer Prizes for 1935.

Journalism awards

Public Service:
 The Sacramento Bee for its campaign against political machine influence in the appointment of two Federal judges in Nevada.
 Honorable mention to The Sheboygan Press (Wisconsin) for "an investigation of conditions in state hospitals resulting in a legislative investigation and correction of evils".
Reporting:
 William Taylor of the New York Herald Tribune for the series of articles on the international yacht races.
Correspondence:
 Arthur Krock of The New York Times for his Washington dispatches
Editorial Writing:
 No award given.

Editorial Cartooning:
 Ross A. Lewis of the Milwaukee Journal for "Sure, I'll Work for Both Sides".

Letters and Drama Awards

Novel:
 Now in November by Josephine Winslow Johnson (Simon & Schuster).
Drama:
 The Old Maid by Zoe Akins (Appleton)
History:
 The Colonial Period of American History by Charles McLean Andrews (Yale Univ. Press).
Biography or Autobiography:
 Biography of Robert E. Lee by Douglas S. Freeman (Scribner).
 Honorable mention to James G. Blaine: A Political Idol of Other Days by David Saville Muzzey (Dodd, Mead).
Poetry:
 Bright Ambush by Audrey Wurdemann (John Day).

References

External links
Pulitzer Prizes for 1935

Pulitzer Prizes by year
Pulitzer Prize
Pulitzer Prize